Francielle Gomes da Rocha, (born 10 June 1992) is a Brazilian handball player. She plays for the Brazilian club Esporte Clube Pinheiros and is also a member of the Brazil women's national handball team.

She has played in the 2012 Women's Junior World Handball Championship.

References

1992 births
Living people
Brazilian female handball players
Handball players at the 2010 Summer Youth Olympics
Expatriate handball players
Brazilian expatriate sportspeople in Austria
Handball players at the 2016 Summer Olympics
Olympic handball players of Brazil
Pan American Games gold medalists for Brazil
Pan American Games medalists in handball
Handball players at the 2015 Pan American Games
South American Games gold medalists for Brazil
South American Games medalists in handball
Competitors at the 2018 South American Games
Medalists at the 2015 Pan American Games
21st-century Brazilian women